The 1943 All-Big Six Conference football team consists of American football players chosen by various organizations for All-Big Six Conference teams for the 1943 college football season.  The selectors for the 1943 season included the United Press (UP).

All-Big Six selections

Backs
 Don Reece, Missouri (UP-1)
 Bob Brumley, Oklahoma (UP-1)
 Howard Tippee, Iowa State (UP-1)
 Bob George, Kansas (UP-1)

Ends
 W. G. Wooton, Oklahoma (UP-1)
 Jack Morton, Missouri (UP-1)

Tackles
 Lee Kennon, Oklahoma (UP-1)
 Alfred Anderson, Missouri (UP-1)

Guards
 Gale Fulghum, Oklahoma (UP-1)
 Bob Eigelberger, Missouri (UP-1)

Centers
 Bob Mayfield, Oklahoma (UP-1)

Key
UP = United Press

See also
1943 College Football All-America Team

References

All-Big Six Conference football team
All-Big Eight Conference football teams